The 2006 women's road cycling season was the second for the Buitenpoort–Flexpoint Team, an 2006 UCI women's cycling team.

Roster

  Annette Beutler (29/06/1976) Contract from 15 June
  Loes Gunnewijk (27/11/1980)   
  Tanja Hennes (30/06/1971)    
  Luise Keller (08/03/1984)   
  Vera Koedooder (31/10/1983)  
  Susanne Ljungskog (16/03/1976) 
  Mirjam Melchers (26/09/1975)   
  Amber Neben (18/02/1975)   
  Sandra Rombouts (29/09/1976)    
  Madeleine Sandig (12/08/1983)    
  Elisabeth van Rooij (25/01/1973)  
  Suzanne van Veen (03/10/1987)   
  Linda Villumsen (09/04/1985)
Source

Season victories

Results in major races

UCI World Ranking

The team finished second in the UCI ranking for teams.

References

2006 UCI Women's Teams seasons
2006 in Dutch sport
Team Flexpoint